The 2006 Dutch Open in badminton was held in Den Bosch, Netherlands, from November 8, 2006 to November 12, 2006.

Men's singles

Seeds

Results

Men's doubles

Seeds

Results

Women's singles

Seeds

Results

Women's doubles

Seeds

Results

Mixed doubles

Seeds

Results

External links
Full results from TournamentSoftware.com

Dutch Open (badminton)
Dutch Open (badminton)
Dutch Open (badminton)